The International Union of Nutritional Sciences (IUNS) is an international non-governmental organization established in 1946 devoted to the advancement of nutrition. 
Its mission and objectives are:

To promote advancement in nutrition science, research, and development through international cooperation at the global level.
To encourage communication and collaboration among nutrition scientists as well as to disseminate information in nutritional science through modern communication technology.

Since its 1946 foundation, the membership has grown to include 83 national adhering bodies and 17 affiliations.

IUNS International Congresses

Governing Council
The Council consists of five Officers, the President, President-Elect, Vice-President, Secretary-General, Treasurer, Immediate Past-President, and six Council members.

IUNS's current council consists of the following:
 President: Alfredo Martinez Hernandez Spain;
 Vice President: V. Prakash India;
 President Elect: Lynette M. Neufeld Canada;
 Secretary General: Catherine Geissler UK;
 Treasurer: Helmut Heseker Germany;
 Member: Hyun-Sook Kim Korea;
 Member: Ali Dhansay South Africa;
 Member: Benjamin Caballero United States;
 Member: Francis Zotor Ghana;
 Member: Andrew Prentice UK;
 Member: Teruo Miyazawa Japan;
 Immediate Past-President: Anna Lartey Ghana.

Headquarters
IUNS is registered in Vienna, Austria.

Secretariat
IUNS;
The Nutrition Society;
Boyd Orr House, 10 Cambridge Court;
210 Shepherds Bush Road;
London;
UK;
W6 7NJ

See also

References

External links
Official website

Food technology organizations
Members of the International Council for Science
Nutritional science organizations
Organizations based in California
Organizations established in 1948
Scientific supraorganizations
Members of the International Science Council